From 1996 to 2006, Megan Huntsman, an American woman, murdered six of her newborn children shortly after giving birth to them in Utah.

The serial infanticide was discovered in April 2014 when Hunstman's ex-husband Darren West began cleaning out the garage of the Pleasant Grove house he once shared with her. While moving several boxes, West discovered a small white box, wrapped in plastic, containing the small, decomposing body of a baby. Appalled by his discovery, he continued to remove the mess at the scene and found six other bodies, one of which was later determined in an autopsy to not have been murdered but was stillborn. West then reported to the police and after an investigation it was determined that the babies were his children, but that Megan Huntsman, unbeknownst to him, had murdered them minutes after they were delivered.

Perpetrator

Megan Huntsman (born February 26, 1975) grew up in Pleasant Grove as the oldest child of an industrial painter and a mother who worked at a grocery store, among other jobs. She was raised in the Church of Jesus Christ of Latter-day Saints, but had not been active by the time of her arrest according to her uncle Larry Huntsman. Megan Huntsman attended Pleasant Grove High School during which she met her future husband Darren West whom she married in April 1993 shortly after turning 18. Their marriage eventually decayed into substance abuse and violence and Darren eventually was convicted of methamphetamine-related charges and was imprisoned between 2006 and 2014.

Murders
Huntsman committed all of her murders either by strangulation or suffocation then hid the bodies in boxes in her garage. Police said Huntsman had been a heavy methamphetamine user and "didn't want the babies". She also said she committed one of the murders when her husband and her brother and sister were in the house watching television. Megan Huntsman's first three children were not murdered and were alive at the time her crimes were discovered.

Legal proceedings
On February 12, 2015, Huntsman pled guilty to six counts of first-degree felony murder. On April 20, Huntsman was sentenced to six counts of 5 years-to-life in prison with three counts to be served consecutively and three counts to be served concurrently.

References

1990s murders in the United States
2000s murders in the United States
Child deaths
Filicides in the United States
Infanticide
Murder in Utah
Serial murders in the United States